Tennis at the 2005 South Pacific Mini Games in Koror was held on July 26, August 3, 2005.

Medal summary

Medal table

Medals events

References

2005 in Palau
2005 South Pacific Mini Games